Revaz Kemoklidze  (born 13 March 1979 in Tbilisi) is a Georgian professional football defender, regarded as one of the best Georgian defenders of his generation.

Club career
His club career started in Dinamo Tbilisi in 1997. Midway in the 2000/01 season he was bought by Torpedo Kutaisi, where he became a key player as they won the league title three years in a row. He then tried his luck in Turkey with Kocaelispor, but following their relegation he returned to Georgia. Before the 2005/06 season Kemoklidze returned to Dinamo Tbilisi.

International career
In addition, he was called up to the national team, where he was capped 20 times between 2000 and 2004.

References

External links

Footballers from Georgia (country)
Expatriate footballers from Georgia (country)
Georgia (country) international footballers
FC Dinamo Tbilisi players
Kocaelispor footballers
Süper Lig players
Expatriate footballers in Turkey
Expatriate sportspeople from Georgia (country) in Turkey
Footballers from Tbilisi
1979 births
Living people
FC Dinamo Batumi players
FC Metalurgi Rustavi players
FC Torpedo Kutaisi players
FC Sioni Bolnisi players
Association football defenders